In the mathematical field of differential topology, the Lie bracket of vector fields, also known as the Jacobi–Lie bracket or the commutator of vector fields, is an operator that assigns to any two vector fields X and Y on a smooth manifold M a third vector field denoted .

Conceptually, the Lie bracket  is the derivative of Y along the flow generated by X, and is sometimes denoted  ("Lie derivative of Y along X"). This generalizes to the Lie derivative of any tensor field along the flow generated by X.

The Lie bracket is an R-bilinear operation and turns the set of all smooth vector fields on the manifold M into an (infinite-dimensional) Lie algebra.

The Lie bracket plays an important role in differential geometry and differential topology, for instance in the Frobenius integrability theorem, and is also fundamental in the geometric theory of nonlinear control systems.

Definitions
There are three conceptually different but equivalent approaches to defining the Lie bracket:

Vector fields as derivations
In this way, each smooth vector field X becomes a derivation on C∞(M). Furthermore, any derivation on C∞(M) arises from a unique smooth vector field X.

This can be used to define the Lie bracket as the vector field corresponding to the commutator derivation:

Flows and limits
Let  be the flow associated with the vector field X, and let D denote the tangent map derivative operator. Then the Lie bracket of X and Y at the point  can be defined as the Lie derivative:

This also measures the failure of the flow in the successive directions  to return to the point x:

In coordinates
Though the above definitions of Lie bracket are intrinsic (independent of the choice of coordinates on the manifold M), in practice one often wants to compute the bracket in terms of a specific coordinate system . We write  for the associated local basis of the tangent bundle, so that general vector fields can be written and for smooth functions .  Then the Lie bracket can be computed as:

Properties

The Lie bracket of vector fields equips the real vector space  of all vector fields on M (i.e., smooth sections of the tangent bundle ) with the structure of a Lie algebra, which means [ • , • ]  is a map  with:
R-bilinearity
Anti-symmetry, 
Jacobi identity, 

An immediate consequence of the second property is that  for any .

Furthermore, there is a "product rule" for Lie brackets. Given a smooth (scalar-valued) function f on M and a vector field Y on M, we get a new vector field fY by multiplying the vector Yx by the scalar f(x) at each point . Then:

where we multiply the scalar function X(f) with the vector field Y, and the scalar function f with the vector field .
This turns the vector fields with the Lie bracket into a Lie algebroid.

Vanishing of the Lie bracket of X and Y means that following the flows in these directions defines a surface embedded in M, with X and Y as coordinate vector fields:

Theorem:   iff the flows of X and Y commute locally, meaning  for all  and sufficiently small s, t.

This is a special case of the Frobenius integrability theorem.

Examples 
For a Lie group G, the corresponding Lie algebra  is the tangent space at the identity , which can be identified with the vector space of left invariant vector fields on G. The Lie bracket of two left invariant vector fields is also left invariant, which defines the Jacobi–Lie bracket operation .

For a matrix Lie group, whose elements are matrices , each tangent space can be represented as matrices: , where  means matrix multiplication and I is the identity matrix.

Applications 

The Jacobi–Lie bracket is essential to proving small-time local controllability (STLC) for driftless affine control systems.

Generalizations
As mentioned above, the Lie derivative can be seen as a generalization of the Lie bracket. Another generalization of the Lie bracket (to vector-valued differential forms) is the Frölicher–Nijenhuis bracket.

References

 
 
 
  Extensive discussion of Lie brackets, and the general theory of Lie derivatives.
  For generalizations to infinite dimensions.
 

Bilinear maps
Differential geometry
Differential topology
Riemannian geometry